The 2013 Island Games in Bermuda was the thirteenth edition in which an association football tournament was played at the multi-games competition.

Owing to the longer than usual distance required to travel to the games, only four teams were able to field a side – none of whom had won a medal before. The four initially played a round robin group stage, with hosts Bermuda and Greenland finishing in the top two to set up a final meeting between the two. The Falkland Islands and Frøya met in the bronze-medal match after finishing 3rd and 4th respectively, with the Falklands winning their first ever football medal at the games.

In the first game of the competition Bermuda, the only FIFA affiliated side in the competition, had beaten Greenland handsomely, but in the final they had to settle for an 88th-minute penalty to win them the competition, with the disconsolate Greenlanders taking the silver medal.

Participants

Matches

Group phase

Final stage

Third place match

Final

Final rankings

See also
Women's Football at the 2013 Island Games

References

Men
2013